In thermodynamics a residual property is defined as the difference between a real fluid property and an ideal gas property, both considered at the same density, temperature, and composition.

Correlated terms
Departure function

References
 J. M. Smith, H.C.Van Ness, M. M. Abbot Introduction to Chemical Engineering Thermodynamics 2000, McGraw-Hill 6TH edition 
 Robert Perry, Don W. Green  Perry's Chemical Engineers' Handbook 2007 McGraw-Hill 8TH edition 

Thermodynamic properties